The Voyages of Marco Polo is a historical-themed euro-style board game with focus on resource management for 2-4 players, released in 2015.

The game won the 2015 Deutscher Spiele Preis award.

References

External links 
 

Board games introduced in 2015
Board games about history
Marco Polo
Deutscher Spiele Preis winners
Worker placement board games